Hisar Urban Agglomeration is an extended area of the city of Hisar which includes the area under the Municipal Corporation of Hisar and the campus of Chaudhary Charan Singh Haryana Agricultural University along with the Mini Secretariat. It is the second biggest urban agglomeration in Haryana after Faridabad.

Demographics 
According to 2011 Census of India, Hisar Urban Agglomeration has a total population of 306,893 of which 166,623 are males and 140,270 are females. Sex ratio is 842 females per thousand males. Overall Literacy rate is 81.17 percent with male literacy rate at 86.28 percent and female literacy rate at 75.08 percent.

See also 
 Hisar (city)
 Hisar district
 Hisar division
 Hisar (Vidhan Sabha constituency)
 Hisar (Lok Sabha constituency)

References 

Hisar (city)